Ireland–Zambia relations are foreign relations between Ireland and Zambia.  Both countries established diplomatic relations in 1965. Ireland has an embassy in Lusaka.  Zambia is represented in Ireland through the Zambian High Commission in London (United Kingdom).

Irish aid

In 2006, the Irish government gave about USD $3 million in aid to fight HIV/AIDS and support orphaned children.

See also 

 Foreign relations of the Republic of Ireland
 Foreign relations of Zambia

References

Sources

External links 

  Irish embassy in Lusaka
  Zambian high commission in London (also accredited to Ireland)

 
Zambia
Bilateral relations of Zambia
Ireland and the Commonwealth of Nations